This page lists board and card games, wargames, miniatures games, and tabletop role-playing games published in 2013.  For video games, see 2013 in video gaming.

Games released or invented in 2013

Game awards given in 2013
Spiel des Jahres: Hanabi
Kennerspiel des Jahres: Legends of Andor
Kinderspiel des Jahres:  Der verzauberte Turm
Deutscher Spiele Preis: Terra Mystica
Games: Trajan

Deaths

See also
List of game manufacturers
2013 in video gaming

References

Games
Games by year